Central Rattanathibet (previously known as CentralPlaza Rattanathibet) is a shopping mall located on Rattanathibet Road in Mueang Nonthaburi District, Nonthaburi.

History
Jusco Rattanathibet was established by Siam Jusco Co., Ltd in 1991.  Central Pattana acquired the shopping mall with land area of 48 rai for BT฿650 million from Siam Jusco Co., Ltd which was the largest Jusco's shopping mall in Thailand on 30 December 2003 and renamed to 'Central Town Center Rattanathibet' on 1 January 2004 and changed supermarket operator from Jusco to Tops Supermarket.

Mall renovations
On 15 June 2005, Robinson Department Store opened new 19th branch in 7 years at 'Central Town Center'.

Central Pattana finished  first phase shopping mall expansion of new  retailing area including cinema and Robinson Department Store in September 2005.

The shopping mall was renamed to 'CentralPlaza Rattanathibet' and finished phase 2 expansion of retailing and parking area for BT฿1,882 million in December 2006.

Overview 
The shopping mall provides a mix of retail shops, a Robinson Department Store, a food court, an 8-screen cinema, and a game arcade. The shopping mall consist of 3 buildings.

Robinson building
This building has 3 floors and consist of 2 major tenants including Robinson Department Store and B2S, Supersports, Power Buy.

BnB Home building (Old Homeworks)
This building has 3 floors and consists of many major tenants including BnB Home (Baan & Beyond), SF Cinema and Tops.

Index Building
This building has 9 floors and is the newest building consist of Index Living Mall, Officemate, Fitness First as major tenants and 6 floors parking. It has 2 bridges connect with Robinson building on 2nd and 3rd floor.

See also 
 List of shopping malls in Thailand

External links 
 Central Group website

Notes

References 
 
 

Shopping malls in Thailand
Central Pattana
Shopping malls established in 1991
1991 establishments in Thailand